Oak Hill is an area in Stoke-on-Trent.

References

Villages in Staffordshire